Cockle Creek is a  stream in Chincoteague, Virginia between Chincoteague Inlet to the south and Chincoteague Bay to the north.  It was the site of a naval battle during the American Civil War, the Battle of Cockle Creek.

See also
List of rivers of Virginia

References

Chincoteague, Virginia
Rivers of Accomack County, Virginia
Rivers of Virginia